Hockley is a large village and civil parish in Essex in the East of England located between Chelmsford and Southend-on-Sea, or, more specifically,  between Rayleigh and Rochford. It came to prominence during the coming of the railway in the 1890s and at the 2001 census had a population of 13,616 people, reducing to 9,616 at the 2011 Census,. The parish of Hockley itself had a population of 8,909 at the (2001 census), while the urban area runs into the neighbouring parish of Hawkwell. Hockley railway station serves the village.

History 
The place-name 'Hockley' is first attested in the Domesday Book of 1086, where it appears as Hocheleia. The name means "Hocca's woodland clearing or glade". Today there is still a large wooded area named Hockley Woods. Notable buildings in the village include the church of St Peter and Paul, which has a nave which was possibly built before the twelfth century, a thirteenth-century chancel and a fourteenth-century tower, the upper half of which is octagonal and was built at a later date. The tower holds three bells, manufactured by Miles Gray in 1626, by James Bartlett in 1684 and by John Hodgson in 1657, and the building is Grade II* listed. The church is situated to the north-west of the village centre, where the Grade II listed Spa Pump Room is situated. The building was built as a spa to a design by James Lockyer in 1842, after Robert Clay found a medicinal spring there in 1838. Hockley is also the site of the former Bullwood Hall prison which closed in 2013.

Plumberow Mount, a Roman burial mound, was excavated in 1913 by Mr. E. B. Francis. At the time, there was a summer house on the top of the mound, and so trenches were cut on three sides. The excavation found a Roman coin of Domitian, and some Saxon pottery which may indicate a secondary burial. Since 2005, the mound has been surrounded by a metal fence to protect it from erosion, and a number of trees which were growing on or near it were cut down at the same time.

In 2009, the sixteenth-century Hockley Pendant was discovered in a field at Hockley.

Governance 
Hockley has a parish council consisting of two wards and is part of Rochford District Council

References

External links 
 
 Hockley Parish Council
 The Parish Church of St Peter and St Paul, Hockley
 St Peter and St Paul Church, Hockley, Essex. A 360 Degree Virtual Tour
 Hockley & Hawkwell Methodist Church
 The Commy | Hockley Community Centre Association & Social Bar, Hockley
 Hawkwell Athletic Football Club

Villages in Essex
Rochford District